Ibrahim Chahrani (born 27 March 1972) is a Libyan chess FIDE Master (FM) and Chess Olympiad individual gold medal winner (2004).

Biography
In 2004, in Antalya, Ibrahim Chahrani shared third place in the Mediterranean Chess Championship. In 2007, he ranked fifth in the Arab Chess Championship.

Ibrahim Chahrani played for Libya in the Chess Olympiads:
 in 2004, at the second reserve board in the 36th Chess Olympiad in Calvià (+6, =1, -0), winning a gold medal,
 in 2006, at the first board in the 37th Chess Olympiad in Turin (+4, =3, -5),
 in 2008, at the third board in the 38th Chess Olympiad in Dresden (+3, =0, -6),
 in 2010, at the third board in the 39th Chess Olympiad in Khanty-Mansiysk (+5, =3, -2),
 in 2014, at the second board in the 41st Chess Olympiad in Tromsø (+0, =0, -11).

Ibrahim Chahrani played for Libya in the African Games:
 in 2003, at the reserve board in the 8th African Games in Abuja (+4, =1, -2),
 in 2007, at the second board in the 9th African Games in Algiers (+1, =2, -5).

Ibrahim Chahrani played for Libya in the Pan Arab Games:
 in 2007, at the fourth board in the 11th Pan Arab Games in Cairo (+3, =0, -4),
 in 2011, at the third board in the 12th Pan Arab Games in Doha (+3, =0, -5).

References

External links

Ibrahim Chahrani chess games at 365Chess.com

1972 births
Living people
Libyan chess players
Chess FIDE Masters
Chess Olympiad competitors
Competitors at the 2003 All-Africa Games
Competitors at the 2007 All-Africa Games
African Games competitors for Libya